Jack Clarence Sachse (January 15, 1921 – March 1, 1988) was an American football linebacker who was drafted with the 67th overall pick by the Brooklyn Tigers in the 1944 NFL Draft. He only played for the 1945 season and played four games.

Life
Sachse was born in 1921 in Wichita Falls, Texas, and died in Velpen, Indiana in 1988.

References

1921 births
1988 deaths
American football linebackers
Brooklyn Tigers players
People from Wichita Falls, Texas